Isabelle of Orléans or Isabelle d'Orléans may refer to:
 Élisabeth Marguerite d'Orléans (1646-1696), Duchess of Alençon and Angoulême
 Princess Isabelle of Orléans (1878–1961), member of the French Orleanist royal family and by marriage Duchess of Guise
 Princess Isabelle of Orléans (1900–1983), member of the House of Orléans and by marriage Countess of Harcourt
 Princess Isabelle of Orléans-Braganza (1911–2003), historical author and consort of the Orleanist pretender, Henri, Count of Paris